First Duo Concert is an album by American jazz saxophonist Anthony Braxton and British guitarist Derek Bailey recorded in 1974 at the Wigmore Hall in London and released by Emanem.

Reception
The Allmusic review by Steve Loewy awarded the album 4½ stars stating "surprisingly accessible, and contrasts two complementary approaches within the free music genre".

Track listing
All compositions by Anthony Braxton and Derek Bailey except as indicated
 "The First Set - Area 1" – 8:22   
 "The First Set - Area 2" – 3:12   
 "The First Set - Area 3 (Open)" – 8:44   
 "The First Set – Area 4 (Solo)" (Bailey) – 2:43   
 "The First Set – Area 5" – 5:21   
 "The First Set – Area 6" – 6:08   
 "The Second Set – Area 7" – 6:48   
 "The Second Set – Area 8" – 6:23   
 "The Second Set – Area 9 (Solo)" (Braxton) – 5:56   
 "The Second Set – Area 10" – 4:29   
 "The Second Set – Area 11 (Open)" – 15:29   
 "The Second Set – Area 12" – 3:57  
Recorded at the Wigmore Hall in London on June 30, 1974

Personnel
Anthony Braxton – soprano saxophone, alto saxophone, soprano clarinet, clarinet, contrabass clarinet, flute
Derek Bailey – electric guitar, acoustic guitar (tracks 1–8 & 10–12)

References

Emanem Records albums
Anthony Braxton live albums
Derek Bailey (guitarist) live albums
1974 albums